René Texier (28 October 1882 – 10 October 1967) was a French sport shooter who competed in the 1912 Summer Olympics, in the 1920 Summer Olympics, and in the 1924 Summer Olympics. He was born in Chantilly. In 1912 he was a member of the French team which finished sixth in the team clay pigeons event. In the individual trap competition he finished 48th. Eight years later he was part of the French team which finished seventh in the team clay pigeons event. At the 1924 Games he finished eleventh with the French team in the team clay pigeons competition.

References

External links
 

1882 births
1967 deaths
French male sport shooters
Trap and double trap shooters
Olympic shooters of France
Shooters at the 1912 Summer Olympics
Shooters at the 1920 Summer Olympics
Shooters at the 1924 Summer Olympics